Association Sportive Kabasha  is a Congolese football club based in Goma, North Kivu province  and currently playing in the Linafoot Ligue 2, the second level of the Congolese football.  

They play in the Linafoot Ligue 2, the second level of professional football in DR Congo and their home games are played at Stade de l’Unité de Goma.

History
Founded in 1959, AS Kabasha, won the Coupe du Congo in 2005 after defeating SC Cilu 4-2 on penalties.

After fourteen years of absence, Les Verts et Noirs, promoted back to Linafoot, winning the Eastern Zone of the 2020–21 Linafoot Ligue 2.

Honours
Coupe du Congo
 Winners (1): 2005
SuperCoupe du Congo
 Runners-up (1): 2006

Performance in CAF competitions
CAF Confederation Cup: 1 appearance
2006 – Preliminary Round

References

Football clubs in the Democratic Republic of the Congo
Goma